The Tennessee Tech Golden Eagles  are the intercollegiate athletic teams of Tennessee Technological University (TTU), located in Cookeville, Tennessee, United States. The TTU  athletic program is a member of the Ohio Valley Conference (OVC) and competes in NCAA Division I, including the Football Championship Subdivision . The Tech mascot is Awesome Eagle, and the school colors are purple and gold.

Sports sponsored
A member of the Ohio Valley Conference, Tennessee Technological University sponsors teams in six men's and seven women's NCAA sanctioned sports: Men's tennis competes in the Horizon League after the OVC merged its men's tennis league into that of the Horizon after the 2021–22 season.

Athletic facilities
Source:

Baseball: Bush Stadium at Averitt Express Baseball Complex
Basketball: Eblen Center
Football: Tucker Stadium
Soccer: Tech Soccer Field
Softball: Tech Softball Field

Tennis: Tech Tennis Courts
Indoor Track & Field: (Does not have home competition facility)
Outdoor Track & Field: Tucker Stadium
Volleyball: Eblen Center

National championships

Team

They are in the Ohio Valley Conference.

Individual

References

External links